I Gede Ngurah Swajaya, also known as Ngurah Swajaya, (born 11 March 1962) is an Indonesian diplomat who served as Indonesia’s ambassador to Singapore from 2015 to 2020. Previously, he served as the first ambassador to ASEAN and Cambodia.

Early life 
Ngurah was born in Singaraja, Bali, Indonesia. He is the eldest son of I Gede Kawijaya,S.H and Made Sutini,  who also served as a civil servant with the last position as the chief of the National Land Agency for the Provincial Government of Bali. He was raised as a child in Surabaya and Bali with three of his younger brothers.

Education 
Ngurah attended Udayana University in Bali from 1981 to 1986 majoring in law, and later got his master's degree as Master of Arts (MA), from the Fletcher School of Law and Diplomacy, Tufts University, Boston, MA, USA.

Career 
Ngurah joined the Ministry of Foreign Affairs in 1986, and got his first assignment as the Third Secretary at the Indonesian Embassy to the Federal Republic of Germany, in Bonn from 1991–1995. He was later assigned at the Indonesian Permanent Mission to the United Nations, in New York City, USA from 1999–2003.

At the Ministry of Foreign Affairs, Ngurah served as the Director for the Multilateral Economic and Environment Cooperation, and the Director for ASEAN Political Security Cooperation until 2009.

He was sworn in by President Susilo Bambang Yudhoyono as the Ambassador Extraordinary and Plenipotentiary of Indonesia to the Kingdom of Cambodia on January 30, 2009, from 2009–2010. He presented the letter of credence from the President of the Republic of Indonesia to His Majesty, the King of Cambodia Norodom Sihamoni on April 22, 2009.
Ngurah was later assigned to become the first Permanent Representative/Ambassador Extraordinary and Plenipotentiary of the Republic of Indonesia to ASEAN. He presented the letter of credence from the President of the Republic of Indonesia to the Secretary General of ASEAN on behalf of ASEAN on March 23, 2010.

In February 2016, he was appointed as Indonesian Ambassador to Singapore.

Ngurah has been involved in several international, United Nations and ASEAN negotiations. He served as the Chair or the facilitator in many of those negotiations. He wrote articles for local newspapers and lecture at several universities in Indonesia.

ASEAN 2011 
The Republic of Indonesia served as the rotating chair of ASEAN 2011. In this context, Ngurah was appointed to serve as the Chairperson of the Committee of the Permanent Representative to ASEAN. He also served as the Chairperson of the ASEAN Connectivity Coordinating Committee, that was tasked to coordinate the implementation of the Master Plan of ASEAN Connectivity. As the Permanent Representative of the Republic of Indonesia to ASEAN, he served as the member of the Board of Trustees of the ASEAN Foundation.

Personal life 
In January 1987, Ngurah married Ni Nyoman Mahaswi Astama and now have two children.

References 

1962 births
Living people
Ambassadors of Indonesia to Cambodia
Ambassadors of Indonesia to Singapore
Udayana University alumni
The Fletcher School at Tufts University alumni
Balinese people